Las Juntas may refer to:
 Las Juntas, Ambato, Catamarca, Argentina
 Las Juntas, Belén, Catamarca, Argentina
 Pueblo de las Juntas, California, United States